Noah David Finkelstein (born July 1968) is a professor of physics at the University of Colorado Boulder. He is a founding co-director of the Colorado Center for STEM Learning, a President’s Teaching Scholar, and the inaugural Timmerhaus Teaching Ambassador. His research focuses on physics education and on developing models of context, the scope of which involves students, departments, and institutional scales of transformation. In 2010, Finkelstein testified to the United States House Committee on Science, Space and Technology on how to strengthen undergraduate and postgraduate STEM education.

Education
Finkelstein graduated at Yale University with a magna cum laude degree in mathematics in 1990. He obtained a Ph.D. in applied physics from the Department of Mechanical and Aerospace Engineering at Princeton University in 1998.

Career
Finkelstein was a postdoctoral fellow in physics education research under Professor Michael Cole at the University of California, San Diego, and under Professor Andrea diSessa at the University of California, Berkeley (1998–2001). He was a research fellow at the Laboratory of Comparative Human Cognition, a lecturer in physics and in teacher education (1999–2002), and a physics teacher at High Tech High School (2002–2003). Finkelstein served as a research consultant at the Center for Astrophysics  Harvard & Smithsonian (2002–2004). In 2003, Finkelstein joined the University of Colorado Boulder as an assistant professor of physics. He was promoted to associate professor in 2008 and to full professor in 2012. Finkelstein is a technical advisor at the Association of American Universities Education Initiative, a founding board member of the PER Topical Group, and a trustee of the Higher Learning Commission. He was elected fellow of American Physical Society in 2011 and the American Association for the Advancement of Science in 2021. His primary focus is in physics education research.

Personal life
Finkelstein’s mother Edith B. Gelles is a senior scholar of gender studies at Stanford University. His father is professor emeritus of mathematics at UC Irvine, and his brother Adam is a professor of computer science at Princeton University.

See also
American Association of Physics Teachers
American Physical Society
Learning Assistant Model
PhET Interactive Simulations
Physics education

References

External links
Noah Finkelstein faculty homepage
Finkelstein PER group homepage
Bibliography of technical articles by Finkelstein

1968 births
Princeton University School of Engineering and Applied Science alumni
Yale University alumni
University of Colorado faculty
University of Colorado Boulder faculty
People from Boulder, Colorado
Living people
21st-century American physicists
American educational theorists
Fellows of the American Physical Society